Maelruanaidh Ó Dubhda (died 1221) was King of Uí Fiachrach Muaidhe.

Annalistic references

External links
 http://www.ucc.ie/celt/published/T100005C/index.html

Monarchs from County Mayo
People from County Sligo
13th-century Irish monarchs
1221 deaths
Year of birth unknown